Rich Miner  (born 1964) is an investment partner on the GV team.  Miner joined the GV team in March, 2009 and is based out of Cambridge, MA.  Before joining GV, Miner was a co-founder of Android, Inc., origin of the Android mobile operating system and was an executive on the Android team after its acquisition by Google.  Miner also co-founded Wildfire Communications, a voice communications startup that was sold to Orange in April 2000. He has a doctorate in computer science from the University of Massachusetts Lowell. The Richard A. Miner School of Computer & Information Sciences at UMass Lowell was named after Miner in 2022.

References

Living people
Google employees
University of Massachusetts Lowell alumni
American company founders
1964 births